Naseeruddin Shah (born 20 July 1950) is an Indian actor. He is notable in Indian parallel cinema. He has also starred in international productions. He has won numerous awards in his career, including three National Film Awards, three Filmfare Awards and the Volpi Cup for Best Actor at the Venice Film Festival. The Government of India honoured him with the Padma Shri and the Padma Bhushan awards for his contributions to Indian cinema.

In 1982, he married his second wife, actress Ratna Pathak, daughter of actress Dina Pathak, with whom he has two sons. His sister-in-law is actress Supriya Pathak, who is married to actor Pankaj Kapur.

Early life 
Naseeruddin Shah was born on 20 July 1950 in Barabanki town, Uttar Pradesh, into a Nawab family.

Shah attended St. Anselm's Ajmer school and St Joseph's College, Nainital. He graduated in arts from Aligarh Muslim University in 1971 and attended National School of Drama in Delhi.

His elder brother, Lt. General Zameerud-din Shah (Retd.) PVSM, SM, VSM, was Vice-Chancellor of Aligarh Muslim University.

Career 
Shah has acted in movies such as Nishant, Aakrosh, Sparsh, Mirch Masala, Albert Pinto Ko Gussa Kyon Ata Hai, Trikal, Bhavni Bhavai, Junoon, Mandi, Mohan Joshi Hazir Ho!, Ardh Satya, Katha, and Jaane Bhi Do Yaaro. He made his debut with a small role in film Aman (1967) starring Rajendra Kumar and Saira Banu.

Shah became active in mainstream Bollywood cinema with the 1980 film Hum Paanch. In 1982, he acted in the film Dil Aakhir Dil Hai directed by Ismail Shroff, opposite Rakhee. One of his most important films, Masoom, was released in 1983 and was shot at St Joseph's College, Nainital. His next major success in mainstream films was the 1986 multi-star film Karma where he acted alongside veteran Dilip Kumar. Starring roles for films such as Ijaazat (1987), Jalwa (1988) and Hero Hiralal (1989) followed. In 1988, he played opposite his wife Ratna Pathak as Inspector Ghote, the fictional detective of H. R. F. Keating's novels in the Merchant Ivory English language film The Perfect Murder. He acted with Aditya Pancholi in films like Maalamaal (1988) and Game (1993).

He has acted in several multi-star Bollywood films as well, such as Ghulami (1985), Tridev (1989) and Vishwatma (1992). In 1994, he acted as the villain in Mohra, his 100th film as an actor. He forayed into Malayalam cinema the same year, through T. V. Chandran's drama Ponthan Mada. The film portrayed the irrational bonding of a feudal serf (played by Mammootty) and a colonial landlord (played by Shah). He strongly believed that the distinction between art and commercial films had largely reduced, especially with the directors of the former also making commercial films. In 2000, Shah played Mahatma Gandhi in Kamal Haasan's Hey Ram which focused on the assassination of Gandhi from the assailant's point of view.

Shah played Mohit, the drunken coach to a deaf and mute boy in Iqbal. Shah was noted for his roles in the 1999 Aamir Khan-starrer Sarfarosh, where he played Gulfam Hassan – a ghazal singer-cum-terrorist mastermind — and in Neeraj Pandey's A Wednesday (2008).

Shah has also starred in international projects, such as Monsoon Wedding in 2001 and a Hollywood adaptation of The League of Extraordinary Gentlemen in 2003 (co-starring Sean Connery), where he played Captain Nemo. His portrayal of Nemo was very close to the design of the graphic novel, although his Nemo was far less manic. He worked in Vishal Bhardwaj's Indian adaptation of Shakespeare's Macbeth, titled Maqbool, in 2003, and Rajiv Rai's Asambhav opposite Arjun Rampal and Priyanka Chopra in 2004. He then went on to work in The Great New Wonderful (2005).  Shah played a pivotal role in Today's Special, Aasif Mandvi's 2009 independent comedy film. In 2011, Shah was seen in The Dirty Picture. He acted in Anup Kurian's The Blueberry Hunt, playing a recluse growing marijuana in his forest retreat, and in Waiting, starring opposite Kalki Koechlin, both of which were released in 2016.

Shah made his Pakistani film debut in Khuda Ke Liye by Shoaib Mansoor, where he played a short cameo. His second Pakistani film Zinda Bhaag was selected as the country's official entry to the 86th Academy Awards for the Best Foreign Language Film award.

As a director 
Shah has performed with his theatre troupe at places such as New Delhi, Mumbai, Bangalore and Lahore. He has directed plays written by Lavender Kumar, Ismat Chughtai and Saadat Hasan Manto.

His directorial debut in movies, Yun Hota To Kya Hota, was released in 2006. It stars several established actors such as Konkona Sen Sharma, Paresh Rawal, Irrfan Khan, then-newcomer Ayesha Takia, his son Imaad Shah and his old friend Ravi Baswani.

He has directed several plays written by eminent people such as Saadat Hasan Manto, Ismat Chughtai and Lavendar Kumar.

Other media and art forms 

In 1977, Shah, Tom Alter and Benjamin Gilani formed a theatre group called Motley Productions. Their first play was Samuel Beckett's Waiting for Godot, which was staged at the Prithvi Theatre on 29 July 1979.

In 1988, he acted in the eponymous television series based on the life and times of Mirza Ghalib, directed by Gulzar and telecast on DD National.

In 1989, he acted as the Maratha King Shivaji in another eponymous television series Bharat Ek Khoj based on Jawaharlal Nehru's book The Discovery of India.

In mid 1990s, Shah also hosted some episodes of science magazine programme Turning Point.

In 1999, he acted as a special agent in the TV series Tarkash on Zee TV. He played a retired agent haunted by nightmares who is re-inducted as he apparently knows something about a dreaded terrorist somehow connected with his past. He played the villain with the dual identity of a ghazal singer and a Pakistani spy who supports terrorism in India in Sarfarosh (1999). He was the first of several celebrity actors, who played narrator in the popular audiobook series for kids Karadi Tales. He along with wife Ratna was the narrator in the film Paheli — the Indian entry to the 2006 Academy Awards.

In 2017, Shah returned to film, starring in Shakespearean adaption The Hungry, screened under special presentations at the Toronto International Film Festival 2017. He also acted as lead in The Coffin Maker directed by Veena Bakshi, which however never got released in public but only remained for private viewership.

Personal life 

Shah was married to Manara Sikri and had a daughter, Heeba, with her. In the 1970s, Shah met and fell in love with Ratna Pathak, the daughter of Dina Pathak, a well-respected character actress. During the 70s and 80s they co-starred in several films, including Mirch Masala and The Perfect Murder. They were in a live-in relationship for many years, while Shah put together the mehr required to divorce Manara. Shah and Pathak were finally married in 1982. Manara died the same year due to unknown reasons. By his second marriage, Shah has two sons, Imaad and Vivaan, both of whom are actors. The couple lives in Mumbai with Heeba, Imaad and Vivaan.

Filmography

Awards and nominations

Civilian Awards 
 1987 — Padma Shri — India's fourth highest civilian award.
 2003 — Padma Bhushan — India's third highest civilian award.

Film awards

Other awards 
 2000: Won: Sangeet Natak Akademi Award

Autobiography 
In an interview with HT Brunch, Shah speaks about having thought about an autobiography for almost 10 years. He penned down his thoughts occasionally during this period until he finally came up with 100-odd pages. What had started as an amusing pastime had clearly grown into something much deeper. He then presented the unfinished version to his friend, historian Ramchandra Guha, who encouraged Shah to complete it and send it to a publication house. Shah's memoir is titled And Then One Day, and was published by Hamish Hamilton.

Controversies

Comments on “The Kashmir Files”
Naseeruddin Shah heavily criticized the film The Kashmir Files. He criticized the controversial film by calling it an “almost fictionalized version” of the suffering of the Kashmiri Hindus. The government is promoting it instead of ensuring security and rehabilitation for the community, Shah said. On which the director replied, “I agree with this. You are indeed abused and penalised for talking about Kashmiri Hindu Genocide in your own country.” Many Indians also have accused him for trivializing the seriousness of The Persecution of Kashmiri Hindus.

Criticising veterans 
Naseeruddin has been frequently involved in controversy with his criticism of senior actors like Dilip Kumar, fellow actors like Anupam Kher, Amitabh Bachchan, juniors like Shahrukh Khan, Salman Khan, cricketer Virat Kohli and politician and Prime minister Narendra Modi. Shah once said that people watching movies of Shahrukh and Salman should not watch his movies. In July 2016, Shah blamed Rajesh Khanna for mediocrity in movies with his poor acting during the 1970s. He also stated that Khanna was not an alert person whom he had met. However, later after criticism from several people in the Bollywood fraternity including Khanna's daughter Twinkle, Naseeruddin apologized about his views. On 18 December 2018, he sparked a controversy by calling Virat Kohli as the worst behaved cricketer in the world.

In January 2020, Shah was targeted by  media after criticizing his  co-actor colleague Anupam Kher for his views supporting the Indian government’s Citizenship Amendment Act, calling him a clown and sycophant.

Comments about Safety in India 
He stated that he felt unsafe in current day India and was worried about the safety of his children if they were caught in a mob violence situation. After which Indian netizens criticized him and gave examples of violence and mob lynching by  Islamists.

References

External links 

 
 

1950 births
Living people
Naseeruddin Shah
People from Barabanki, Uttar Pradesh
Indian male film actors
Indian expatriate male actors in Pakistan
Male actors in Hindi cinema
Recipients of the Padma Bhushan in arts
Recipients of the Sangeet Natak Akademi Award
Filmfare Awards winners
Screen Awards winners
Best Supporting Actor National Film Award winners
Aligarh Muslim University alumni
National School of Drama alumni
Film and Television Institute of India alumni
Male actors from Mumbai
Volpi Cup for Best Actor winners
Indian drama teachers
People from Barabanki district
Best Actor National Film Award winners
Male actors in Gujarati-language films
Recipients of the Padma Shri in arts
International Indian Film Academy Awards winners
Indian male stage actors
20th-century Indian male actors
21st-century Indian male actors